Akhyan-e Kuchek (also Romanized as Akhyān-e Kūchek) is a village in Beradust Rural District, Sumay-ye Beradust District, Urmia County, West Azerbaijan Province, Iran. At the 2006 census, its population was 24, in 5 families.

References 

Populated places in Urmia County